This is a list of the largest Jain temples in terms of area.

Current largest temples

See also 
 List of Jain temples
 List of ancient Jain temples

References 

 
Jain architecture
Jainism-related lists